The Tin Mine ( or Maha'lai muang rae) is a 2005 Thai biographical drama film directed by Jira Maligool. It is adapted from short stories by Ajin Panjapan and his semi-autobiographical account of growing up in a mining camp in Kapong District of Phang Nga Province from 1949 to 1953. The Tin Mine was the official entry from Thailand for Best Foreign Language Film at the 78th Academy Awards.

Cast
 Pijaya Vachajitpan as Arjin Panjapan
 Donlaya Mudcha as La-iad
 Sonthaya Chitmanee as Kai
 Anthony Howard Gould as Sam (the boss)
 Ajin Panjapan as himself
 Jaran Petcharoen as Grandpa Deang
 Niran Sattar as John 
 Jumpol Thongtan as the shopkeeper
 Bill O'Leary as Tom (Sam's Brother)

Trivia
 Ajin's boss gives Ajin an airline ticket to return to Bangkok, but the ticket is a flight coupon of Thai Airways International in 2005.

External links

2005 biographical drama films
2005 films
Thai biographical drama films
Thai coming-of-age drama films
Thai-language films
Thai national heritage films
Best Picture Suphannahong National Film Award winners
GMM Tai Hub films
2005 drama films
2000s coming-of-age drama films